"Run to the Sun" is a song by British synth-pop duo Erasure, released in July 1994 as the second single from their sixth studio album, I Say I Say I Say (1994). It is written by Vince Clarke with fellow Erasure member Andy Bell and is an uptempo dance music track that displays signature synthesizer programming by Clarke. The UK 7-inch single of "Run to the Sun" was issued on yellow-coloured vinyl and featured a fold-out poster of the single's cover artwork. The single's B-side, a ballad entitled "Tenderest Moments", was later re-recorded by Erasure in an acoustic version for their 2006 album Union Street.

Released on 18 July, "Run to the Sun" peaked at number six on the UK Singles Chart, becoming Erasure's 15th UK top-10 hit. In the US, the song reached number 24 on the Billboard Bubbling Under Hot 100 Singles chart and number 14 on the Billboard Hot Dance Music/Club Play chart. Elsewhere, the song reached number five in Finland, number 19 in Ireland and Sweden, and number 49 in Germany.

Critical reception
AllMusic editor Ned Raggett viewed the song as "strident" and "full-on pep". Larry Flick from Billboard declared it as a "rave-happy pop/dance ditty", noting that "as always, singer Andy Bell is a delight, while synthmaster Vince Clarke offers a racing beat and tweaking computer noises. Layered between the two is a sweet, contagious hook that sticks to the brain upon impact." A reviewer from Cashbox named it "one of the best tracks from the excellent new Erasure album", calling it a "quickly-paced, freestyle synth romp." The reviewer added, "Vince Clark flicks his snappy keyboard stings throughout, while Andy Bell’s songbird voice and longing-for-thou lyrics shoot right for the heart. Top-40 potential here, with alternative and modern rockers again laying the foundation for the band." 

Chris Willman from Los Angeles Times felt that the song, "which may or may not be a paean to a departed loved one, should score big at the clubs." Alan Jones from Music Week wrote, "Too much bluster and too little substance here, as Erasure switch to automatic pilot on a song that lacks melodic substance. Not one of their bigger hits, though it should make a brief appearance in the Top 20." Darren Lee from The Quietus declared it a "surefooted day-glo" pop anthem, "which fitted seamlessly into the canon". James Hamilton from the RM Dance Update described it as "old fashioned galloping 133.9bpm Hi-NRG". Sal Cinquemani from Slant Magazine remarked that Bell explores lower voice registers on "inventive and ornate overdubs pad songs", like "the sci-fi/techno dance" number "Run to the Sun". Dardy Chang from American independent newspaper Stanford Daily stated that its "bouncy, relentless" beat "makes it an instant dance hit."

Music video
A music video was produced to promote the single, directed by German director Nico Beyer. It was shot at the World Clock in Alexanderplatz, Berlin and features an early appearance by Jason Statham as a silver-painted background dancer.

Track listings

 UK CD1
 "Run to the Sun" – 4:13
 "Tenderest Moments" – 5:29
 "Run to the Sun" (Beatmasters' Galactic mix) – 7:19

 UK CD2
 "Run to the Sun" (Beatmasters' Outergalactic mix) – 5:37
 "Run to the Sun" (The Simon & Diamond Bhangra remix) – 4:25
 "Run to the Sun" (Set the Controls for the Heart of the Sun mix) – 6:20
 "Run to the Sun" (Amber Solaire) – 10:11

 UK 12-inch single
A1. "Run to the Sun"
A2. "Run to the Sun" (Beatmasters' Galactic mix)
A3. "Run to the Sun" (Amber Solaire)
B1. "Run to the Sun" (Beatmasters' Outergalactic mix)
B2. "Run to the Sun" (The Simon & Diamond Bhangra remix)
B3. "Run to the Sun" (Set the Controls for the Heart of the Sun mix)
B4. "Run to the Sun" (Diss-Cuss mix)

 UK 7-inch and cassette single; Japanese mini-CD single
 "Run to the Sun"
 "Tenderest Moments"
 "Run to the Sun" (Beatmasters' Intergalactic mix)

 US, Canadian, and Australian maxi-CD single
 "Run to the Sun" (7-inch version) – 4:14
 "Run to the Sun" (Beatmasters' Galactic mix) – 7:22
 "Run to the Sun" (Amber Solaire mix) – 10:14
 "Run to the Sun" (Beatmasters' Outergalactic mix) – 5:38
 "Run to the Sun" (The Simon & Diamond Bhangra remix) – 4:27
 "Run to the Sun" (Set the Controls for the Heart of the Sun mix) – 6:20

 US cassette single
 "Run to the Sun" (7-inch mix)
 "Run to the Sun" (Beatmasters' Intergalactic mix)
 "Tenderest Moments"

Charts

References

1994 singles
1994 songs
Elektra Records singles
Erasure songs
Music videos directed by Nico Beyer
Mute Records singles
Songs written by Andy Bell (singer)
Songs written by Vince Clarke